Nicola Scott is a comics artist from Sydney, Australia whose notable works include Birds of Prey and Secret Six. In 2016, she and writer Greg Rucka relaunched Wonder Woman for DC Comics Rebirth and created the comic series  Black Magick, which was published by Image Comics.

Career 

After a brief acting career, Scott decided in 2001 to become a comic book artist. She made her debut in the comics industry by  painting covers for a series titled The Watch published in Australia by Phosphorescent Comics. In 2002, she traveled to the San Diego Comic-Con International to begin making contacts in the U.S. comics industry.  In 2003, she obtained work from Top Cow Comics which in turn led to her being hired by DC Comics. Her first work in the U.S. market appeared in Star Wars: Empire #26 (October 2004) published by Dark Horse Comics. In December 2005, Wizard magazine featured Scott as a "Talent to Watch". At DC, she collaborated with writer Gail Simone on Birds of Prey and Secret Six. In 2010, she drew the Wonder Woman tie-in to Blackest Night. In July 2010, Scott was announced as the artist of the Teen Titans starting with issue #88 and she drew the series until the end of its run with issue #100 (October 2011). Scott penciled Superman vol 3 issues #3, 5, and 6. In January 2012, DC announced Scott and writer James Robinson as the creative team of Earth 2, a new series focusing on the Justice Society of America. Scott's work on that series has been described as her "mainstream breakthrough". She drew the creator-owned series, Black Magick, which was written by Greg Rucka and published by Image Comics. She and Rucka launched a new Wonder Woman series for DC Comics in June 2016. Scott draws the even-numbered issues and Liam Sharp draws the odd-numbered issues. Scott left the Wonder Woman series as of issue #14 and returned to drawing Black Magick.

Critical reception 
Reviewer Doug Zawisza of Comic Book Resources praised Scott's work on Superman #6 and compared her favorably to George Pérez, stating, "Luckily, it seems Scott can keep up with Pérez line for line. While Scott’s is definitely more grounded in reality than Pérez's (evident in the scene featuring the alien landscape of Jazuur), these two creators work quite well together. Scott’s art, from quiet moments like Lois calling out to Clark to the louder moments of the Supermen battle royale, is consistent and breathtaking, begging the readers to stop awhile and study it."
Critic Mike Miallaro of CriticalBlast.com had positive words for Scott's art in Black Magick saying that "she really goes above and beyond throughout this entire book. Everything is drawn with such incredible detail." Karen O'Brien with CBR Exclusives gave praise for Scott's detail work in the "Wonder Woman Year One" finale. She said that "Scott's scrupulous attention to detail through this series had indicated a deference for Wonder Woman’s importance in comics history and a bold determination to bring her forward, providing a believable place for the Amazon’s values in the modern world that feels comfortable and never contrived."

Works 
Star Wars: Empire #26–27: "General Skywalker" (with Ron Marz, ongoing series, Dark Horse Comics, October–November 2004)
Star Wars: Free Comic Book Day (with Miles Lane, one-shot, Dark Horse Comics, May 2005)
Season of the Witch #3–4 (with Jai Nitz, four issue limited series, Image Comics, January–March 2006)
Angel Spotlight: Illyria (with Peter David, one-shot, IDW Publishing, April 2006)
Spike vs. Dracula #5 (with Peter David,  five issue limited series, IDW Publishing, June 2006)
Halloween Man, Drew Edwards
Birds of Prey #100–110, #113–119 (with Gail Simone, DC Comics, January 2007–August 2008)
 "Chapter Four: Fang You So Very Much" (with Wilfred Santiago, in Dead High Yearbook, graphic novel, Penguin Publishing, 2007)
 "The Origin of the Birds of Prey" (with Mark Waid, in 52 #48, limited series, DC Comics, June 2007)
Secret Six #1–7, 9–14 (with Gail Simone, ongoing series, DC Comics, November 2008–December 2009)
Blackest Night: Wonder Woman (with Greg Rucka,  three issue mini-series, DC Comics, February–April 2010)
Wonder Woman vol. 3 #42–44, and a pin-up for #600 (with Gail Simone, ongoing series, DC Comics, May 2010–July 2010)
Teen Titans vol. 3 #88–100 (with J. T. Krul, ongoing series, DC Comics, December 2010–October 2011)
Superman vol. 3 #3, 5–6 (with George Pérez, ongoing series, DC Comics, January 2012–April 2012)
Earth 2 #1–6, 9–12, 14–19, 21–23, 25 (with James Robinson and Tom Taylor, ongoing series, DC Comics, July 2012–January 2013, April 2013–July 2013, September 2013–March 2014, May 2014–July 2014, September 2014)
Legends of the Dark Knight vol. 2 #1 (with Tom Taylor, ongoing series, DC Comics, December 2012)
Convergence: The New Teen Titans #1–2 (with Marv Wolfman, DC Comics, June–July 2015)
Black Magick #1–11 (with Greg Rucka, Image Comics, October 2015–March 2018)
Wonder Woman vol. 5 #2, 4, 6, 10, 12, 14, 750 and Annual #1 (with Greg Rucka, ongoing series, DC Comics, Early September 2016–Early March 2017, March 2020)

References

External links 

Nicola Scott at Mike's Amazing World of Comics
Nicola Scott Image Comics Biography

21st-century Australian artists
Artists from Sydney
Australian comics artists
Australian women artists
DC Comics people
Australian female comics artists
Living people
Year of birth missing (living people)